Things I Carry Around is the eleventh studio album by Australian country music artist Troy Cassar-Daley. The album was released 26 August 2016 and peaked at number 5 on the ARIA Charts.

Things I Carry Around is also the title of Cassar-Daley's autobiography. Cassar-Daley said “After going over so much of my life for the book, it just started to come out of me; the album almost wrote itself”

At the 2017 Country Music Awards of Australia the album won Album of the Year. At the National Indigenous Music Awards of 2017, the album won Album of the Year.

Reception
Working Bull said "It is very much a Troy Cassar-Daley sounding album, staying true to his sounds and his style of music we have all come to love. This album is composed of songs about reflection; some are deep and meaningful, there are also songs that are great easy listening around a fire but they all seem honest and are strong story telling in nature. This album paints a picture of Troy's life from childhood to young adult."

Track listing

Charts

Weekly charts

Year-end charts

Release history

References

2016 albums
Liberation Records albums
Troy Cassar-Daley albums